"Marty" is a 1953 television play by Paddy Chayefsky. It was telecast live May 24, 1953, on The Philco Television Playhouse with Rod Steiger in the title role and Nancy Marchand, in her television debut, playing opposite him as Clara. Chayefsky's story of a decent, hard-working Bronx butcher, pining for the company of a woman in his life but despairing of ever finding true love in a relationship, was produced by Fred Coe with associate producer Gordon Duff.

The teleplay was adapted into the feature film Marty starring Ernest Borgnine in 1955. It was directed by Delbert Mann and written by Chayefsky. The film won both the Academy Award for Best Picture and the Palme d'Or award at the Cannes Film Festival and Borgnine won the Academy Award for Best Actor.

Development
In his collected Television Plays (1955), Chayefsky recalled:
I set out in Marty to write a love story, the most ordinary love story in the world. I didn't want my hero to be handsome, and I didn't want the girl to be pretty. I wanted to write a love story the way it would literally have happened to the kind of people I know... The actor who played Marty, Rod Steiger, is one of the most gifted young actors in the theater, and I owe him a genuine debt of gratitude for all that he contributed to this show.

The story originated by chance when Delbert Mann and Chayefsky were rehearsing The Reluctant Citizen in the old Abbey Hotel's ballroom on West 51st Street, which was also used for Friday night meetings of the Friendship Club. After Chayefsky wandered around and spotted a sign which read, "Girls, Dance With the Man Who Asks You. Remember, Men Have Feelings, Too", he told Mann he thought there was a play possibility about a young woman in that type of setting. Speaking to Mann later that day, he told him that such a drama could work better with a man as the central character rather than a woman. Mann told him to go talk to Fred Coe, which Chayefsky did. He pitched the idea by simply saying, "I want to do a play about a guy who goes to a ballroom." Coe told him to start writing it.  

As Chayefsky was in the middle of writing the script (at this point entitled "Love Story"), Coe and Mann unexpectedly rejected another script that was scheduled for production.  Coe then called Chayefsky to ask him how the "Love Story" script was going, hoping that it could be put into production immediately.  At that point, Chayefsky was partway through act 2, and thought he could have it finished in a few weeks, but after talking with Coe he agreed to turn around material in only a few days.  

The piece was cast and rehearsals got underway with only acts 1 & 2 having been delivered. Chayefsky delivered Act 3 one day later than expected, but still in time to give the cast and crew several days of rehearsal with the complete teleplay.   

Chayefsky's original title "Love Story" was deemed unacceptable by NBC, who requested the title be changed.  Chayefsky's alternative title of "Marty" was used instead.

Reception
Tony Schwartz reviewed the television production in The New York Times:

The acclaimed television drama was honored a decade later when the kinescope of the production was selected for showing at the Museum of Modern Art on February 17–20, 1963, as part of Television USA: Thirteen Seasons, described by MoMA Film Library curator Richard Griffith as "a grand retrospective of the best that has been done in American television."

It was released on VHS by Wood Knapp Video.

The original 1953 telecast is commercially available as part of a three-DVD set, "The Golden Age of Television" (Criterion Collection), a series which aired on PBS in 1981 with Eva Marie Saint as the host of Marty. It features interviews with Steiger, Marchand and Mann.

Only Esther Minciotti, Augusta Ciolli and Joe Mantell repeated their 1953 TV drama roles in the 1955 film adaptation. Steiger turned down the opportunity to repeat his role in the film because he did not want to compromise his independence, while producers Hecht-Lancaster insisted he sign a multi-picture contract.

See also

Wisconsin Center for Film and Theater Research

References

External links 
 

Plays by Paddy Chayefsky
Black-and-white American television shows
American live television shows
Plays set in New York City
Television anthology episodes
Fictional butchers
1953 television plays
Television episodes directed by Delbert Mann
The Philco Television Playhouse episodes

ja:マーティ (映画)